The Torre dello Standardo is a tower in Mdina, Malta, forming part of the city's fortifications. It was built by the Order of St. John between 1725 and 1726, on the site of an earlier tower, and its purpose was to communicate signals between Mdina and the rest of Malta. Today, the tower is in good condition, and it serves as a tourist information centre and for occasional cultural events.

History

Torre Mastra/de la Bandiera 
The Torre dello Standardo was built on site of a medieval tower called the Torre Mastra or the Torre de la Bandiera. The site is located near the Mdina Gate, the main entrance of the city.

It was one of a series of towers located within the fortifications of Mdina. The tower, like many other medieval buildings in Mdina, had suffered significant damage during the 1693 Sicily earthquake. The tower was eventually demolished in March 1725 to be replaced by the Torre dello Standardo.

Torre dello Standardo/Stendardo 
Torre dello Standardo started to be built in 1725 to designs of the French military engineer Charles François de Mondion, as part of a project to rebuild the entrance to Mdina in the Baroque style during the magistracy of Grand Master António Manoel de Vilhena. It was completed in July 1726.

During the Maltese uprising of 1798 against the French occupation of Malta, rebels hosted Maltese, Neapolitan and Portuguese flags on the tower when the Portuguese Navy came to aid the insurgents. It remained in use as a signal tower until the early periods of the British rule.

Use

Purposely built 
Both the Torre Mastra and the Torre dello Standardo served the same purpose to relay signals from Mdina to the rest of the island of Malta. A fire would be ignited to send a warning to the inhabitants and nearby towers in case of an invasion, while it was also armed with canons which fired every evening before the city closes the entrances.

Adaptive reuse 
In the 19th century, when the nearby Palazzo Vilhena was used as a sanatorium by the British military, the tower was used to house the porter and other servants of the sanatorium. By 1888, it was being used as a Telegraph Office. The tower eventually became a police station, until the police moved across the street to the former Maltacom Building in 2002.

Since March 2011 the tower has been a tourist information centre.

Other 
The tower, along with the rear of the Mdina Gate, was depicted on the Lm5 banknote that was in circulation between 1989 and 2007.

Architecture 

The Torre dello Standardo's design is similar to the coastal watchtowers such as the De Redin towers that the Order built in Malta during the 17th century. It has the same basic layout, with two floors and a scarped base. However, this tower is of finer construction than the coastal towers, having decorative Baroque elements such as mouldings, as well as escutcheons containing the coats of arms of De Vilhena and the city of Mdina. The sculptural details are the work of Francesco Zahra. The tower has a cylindrical stair-hood with a dome, and this feature is similar to that found at Palazzo Stagno and the now-demolished Gourgion Tower.

Heritage 
The tower is a heritage and cultural building. It was included on the Antiquities List of 1925. It is now scheduled as a Grade 1 national monument, and it is also listed on the National Inventory of the Cultural Property of the Maltese Islands.

Further reading 
 Building material and mason
 pp.69-70

References

External links 

Fortified towers in Malta
Mdina
Towers completed in 1726
Baroque architecture in Malta
Limestone buildings in Malta
Hospitaller fortifications in Malta
Defunct police stations in Malta
Visitor centers
National Inventory of the Cultural Property of the Maltese Islands
18th-century fortifications
18th Century military history of Malta